Leopardus vorohuensis is an extinct species of feline. Fossils of the species were found in the Vorohué Formation of Argentina and dated to the Uquian age of the early middle Pleistocene. It is the earliest known cat of the ocelot lineage of neotropical cats.

Taxonomy 
Leopardus vorohuensis was originally described in 1983 by paleontologist Annalisa Berta, who placed it as a member of the genus Felis. It was later assigned to the genus Leopardus by the paleontologist John Alroy after a comparative study of various feline fossil species.

References 

Leopardus
Prehistoric felines
Pliocene mammals of South America
Pleistocene mammals of South America
Uquian
Neogene Argentina
Pleistocene Argentina
Fossils of Argentina
Fossil taxa described in 1983